Aqua Moto Racing is an iOS game developed by Swedish studio Resolution Interactive and released on March 7, 2009. It was followed by Aqua Moto Racing 2 (2010), Aqua Moto Racing 3D (2013), Aqua Moto Racing Utopia (2016) and Snow Moto Racing Freedom (2018). A Wii U port was released on April 19, 2018.

Critical reception
Aqua Moto Racing 2 has a Metacritic score of 85% based on 6 critic reviews.

Aqua Moto Racing 3D has a Metacritic score of 52% based on 8 critic reviews.

References

2009 video games
IOS games
IOS-only games
Wii U games
Personal watercraft racing video games
Video games developed in Sweden